Mexico competed at the modern Olympic Games for the first time at the 1900 Summer Olympics in Paris, France.

Medalists
Medals awarded to participants of mixed-NOC teams are represented in italics. These medals are not counted towards the individual NOC medal tally.

Results by event

Polo

Mexico was one of four nations to compete in the first Olympic polo event.  The Mexican foursome tied for third place despite losing their only match.

References
 

Nations at the 1900 Summer Olympics
1900
Olympics